The Dissolving Room is Shearwater's first full-length album, released on February 20, 2001, by Grey Flat Records.

Track listing
"Mulholland" (Jonathan Meiburg) - 3:27
"Ella is the First Rider" (Will Sheff) - 3:38
"Grey Lining" (Will Sheff) - 3:25
"Angelina" (Jonathan Meiburg) - 2:39
"Sung into the Street" (Will Sheff) - 3:15
"Little Locket" (Will Sheff) - 3:12
"Military Clothes" (Jonathan Meiburg) - 2:17
"The Left Side" (Will Sheff) - 2:59
"Not Tonight" (Will Sheff) - 3:52
"If You Stay Sober" (Jonathan Meiburg) - 2:49
"Long Ride" (Will Sheff) - 1:32
"This Confiscated House" (Jonathan Meiburg) - 2:59

References

External links
Grey Flat Records
Official Shearwater site

2001 debut albums
Shearwater (band) albums